Baby Mine is a 1928 silent film comedy produced and distributed by Metro-Goldwyn-Mayer. This film is a remake of the 1917 film Baby Mine both being based on Margaret Mayo's 1910 Broadway comedy Baby Mine. This film stars Karl Dane, George K. Arthur and Charlotte Greenwood and is her third feature film, she having made two previous films in 1916 and 1918.

Cast
 Karl Dane - Oswald Hardy
 George K. Arthur - Jimmy Hemingway
 Charlotte Greenwood - Emma
 Louise Lorraine - Helen

Preservation status
Baby Mine is now considered a lost film.

References

External links
 
 Baby Mine at SilentEra
 Baby Mine synopsis at AllMovie
 Swedish release lobby poster(Wayback Machine)
 lantern slide

1928 films
American silent feature films
Films directed by Robert Z. Leonard
American films based on plays
Lost American films
Silent American comedy films
Remakes of American films
1928 comedy films
Metro-Goldwyn-Mayer films
American black-and-white films
1928 lost films
Lost comedy films
Films with screenplays by F. Hugh Herbert
1920s American films